Quist is a surname. It usually is of Scandinavian origin as a variant of Qvist. It is also a Dutch toponymic surname from the island of Tholen, referring to a piece of land called `t Quistken. The surname is also common in coastal Ghana, originating during the colonial era from Gold Coast Euro-African unions. People with the surname include:

 Adrian Quist (1913–1991), Australian tennis player
 Allen Quist (born 1944), American (Minnesota) politician
 Anne Quist (born 1957), Dutch rower
 Beth Quist (born 1970s), American vocalist and multi-instrumentalist
 Buster Quist (born 1936), American javelin thrower
 Edward Quist (born 1976), American director, screenwriter, and multidiscipline artist 
 Emmanuel Charles Quist (1880-1959), Ghanaian barrister, judge and first Speaker of the Parliament of Ghana
 Flemming Quist Møller (1942-2022), Danish director, screenwriter, animator and voice actor
 Gordon Jay Quist (born 1937), American (Michigan) District Judge 
 Harlin Quist (c.1930–2000), American children's books publisher
 Janet Quist (born 1955), American model and actress
 Johan Martin Quist, (1755–1818), Danish architect
 Karl Quist (1875–1957), Australian cricketer
 Leen Quist (1942–2014), Dutch ceramist
 Lucy Quist (born 1974), Ghanaian business executive in England
 Neville Quist (born 1952), Australian fashion designer
 Ofeibea Quist-Arcton (born 1958), Ghanaian radio journalist and broadcaster 
 Per-Ola Quist (born 1961), Swedish Olympic swimmer
 Rasmus Quist Hansen (born 1980), Danish rower and Olympic athlete
 Rob Quist (born 1948), American musician and congressional candidate
 Jacob Quistgaard (Quist), Danish guitarist, songwriter and YouTube personality

See also
 Hambrecht & Quist, an investment bank based in San Francisco, California
 Qvist (surname)
Quist, a henchman of Emilio Largo who was fed to sharks for failing to assassinate James Bond

References

Danish-language surnames
Dutch-language surnames
Swedish-language surnames
Toponymic surnames